Narikun Ketprapakorn (born July 26, 1997), also known as Frung, is a Thai actress. She is known as Oil in Thai series, Hormones.

Biography 
Narikun was born in Bangkok and has 2 younger brothers. She graduated grade and secondary school at Saint Joseph Convent school and Triam Udom Suksa School respectively. She was an emcee in the game show, Are You Smarter Than Elementary Students? in her 6th grade. She is currently studying in Faculty of Medicine at the Chulalongkorn University.

In 2013, she won the 5th Utip Freshy Idol contest and received the photogenic model award. She soon became a commercial model. Narikun has been selected as cast in the second season of Hormones: The Series after finishing up Top 6 in the reality show project "Hormones The Next Gen".

Filmography

Film

Television Series

TV Show 
 2008 Are You Smarter Than Elementary Students?
 2014 Hormones The Next Gen
 2015 Frozen Hormones
 2016 Hangover Thailand 2016

Music Video 
 2014 Arb Nam Ron - Big Ass
 2015 Yorn - Slot Machine
 2016 Tua Pun Ha - Fymme Bongkot
 2017 Neptune - Gesplanet
 2017 Aitakatta (Ost. Shoot! I Love You) - BNK48
 2018 เพื่อนไม่รัก - Foam

Concert 
 2015 STAR THEQUE GTH 11 ปีแสง

Awards 
 2013 5th Utip Freshy Idol contest : The Winner and The Photogenic Model
 2014 Daradaily The Great Awards : The Rising Star Actress
 2015 MThai Top Talk-About : Top Talk-About Memorable Character

References

External links 
 
 
 

1997 births
Living people
Narikun Ketprapakorn
Narikun Ketprapakorn
Narikun Ketprapakorn
Narikun Ketprapakorn
Narikun Ketprapakorn
Narikun Ketprapakorn
Narikun Ketprapakorn